Newmans Weir is a weir on the River Lea located near Enfield Lock. The weir has wooden sluice gates within cast-iron guide frames. It was reconstructed in 1907, replacing a series of previous timber weirs.

Access
There is no public access. The weir can be seen at a distance from a public footpath at Enfield Island Village.

References

Public transport

The nearest railway station is Enfield Lock.

External links
Newmans Weir- a history

Enfield, London
Weirs on the River Lea
Geography of the London Borough of Enfield